Beilin may refer to:

 Beilin District, Suihua, in Heilongjiang, China
 Beilin District, Xi'an, in Shaanxi province, China, so named after the Bēilín (Stele Forest) museum located there
 Stele Forest (碑林; pinyin: Bēilín), a museum in Beilin District, Xi'an, Shaanxi, China

Surname
 Beilin (Surname)

People with the surname
Michael Beilin (born 1976), Israeli Olympic Greco-Roman wrestler
 Yossi Beilin (born 1948), left-wing Israeli politician
 Irving Berlin (born 1888, Israel Isidore Beilin), American composer and lyricist
 Isaac Beilin (d. 1897), Imperial Russian teacher and physician

See also
 Beilin Road Subdistrict
 Belin (disambiguation)